The 1820 United States presidential election in Maine took place between November 1 to December 6, 1820, as part of the 1820 United States presidential election. The state's popular vote chose nine representatives, or electors to the Electoral College, who voted for President and Vice President.

Maine would vote in its first ever United States presidential election, having become the 23rd state by splitting off Massachusetts on March 15 of the same year. The state would cast its nine electoral votes to Democratic Republican candidate and incumbent President James Monroe, who would win the state by a margin of 91.56%.

Effectively, the 1820 presidential election was an election with no campaign, since there was no serious opposition to Monroe and Tompkins. In fact, they won all the electoral votes barring one from neighboring New Hampshire, which was cast for Secretary of State John Quincy Adams.

See also
 United States presidential elections in Maine

References

1820 United States presidential election by state
United States presidential elections in Maine
1820 Maine elections